Move This House is a reality television series which started airing on the A&E in 2005. Host Tanya Memme and designer Roger Hazard help homeowners who are moving and need help getting their belongings into their new homes.

References

External links
 
 

2000s American reality television series
2005 American television series debuts
2007 American television series endings
A&E (TV network) original programming
English-language television shows
Television shows set in Seattle